Tony Messina is a Boston area chef who won the 2019 James Beard Foundation Award for Best Chef in the Northeast.  The East Boston native was the executive chef and partner at Ken Oringer’s restaurant Uni.,  Messina was a semifinalist in 2017 and a nominee in 2018 in the same category. He finally won in 2019.

He was valedictorian of his class at the Cambridge Culinary School.

In 2021, he moved to Los Angeles.

Later that year, it was announced he and two other chefs planned to open Japanese restaurant Magari on Sunset Boulevard in Hollywood.  Jeremy Umland is one of his partners.  The restaurant opened in March 2022 offering “Tokyo Italian” food,

References

Living people
James Beard Foundation Award winners
American male chefs
Chefs from Boston
People from East Boston, Boston
Year of birth missing (living people)
American restaurateurs